Lucas Ontivero (born 9 September 1994) is an Argentine professional footballer who plays as a winger for Sportivo Trinidense.

Club career

Youth career
Ontivero began playing football with local team San Lorenzo de Alem in his hometown of Catamarca before moving to Venados in Mexico and back to Argentina with Independiente. In December 2011, Ontivero was promoted to the Independiente senior team by Ramón Díaz.

During his youth career, Ontivero spent time with the academies of Real Madrid, Tottenham Hotspur, A.C. Milan and Genoa although FIFA rules prevented him from signing in Europe at that age.

Fénix
Following a disagreement with Christian Díaz who had replaced Ramón Díaz as Independiente manager in March 2012, Ontivero opted for a move to Centro Atlético Fénix of Uruguay's Primera División.

Galatasaray
On 31 January 2014, Ontivero was bought by Turkish club Galatasaray for €2 million. He was sent out on loan in his first full season at the club to fellow Süper Lig team Gaziantepspor and then Budapest Honvéd in Hungarian first division.

The following season Ontivero had  a loan spell with Olimpija Ljubljana in Slovenia.

In January 2016, Ontivero was loaned out again, this time joining MLS team Montreal Impact as a Designated Player. The deal expired at the end of the 2016 season.

On 6 January 2017, Ontivero and Galatasaray mutually agreed to terminate his contract.

Universidad de Chile
After leaving Turkey, Ontivero continued to find it difficult to settle at one team. On 25 January 2017, joined Chilean Primera División team Universidad de Chile. He made his debut on 5 February 2017, coming on as a substitute against Deportes Iquique. However, concerns with both his fitness and attitude, as well as a lack of foreign player roster spots (the Chilean league permits five per team), meant his contract was terminated.

Venados
On 1 July 2017, Ontivero rejoined Venados in Mexico's Ascenso MX where he'd previously been in the academy.

Chacarita Juniors
On 25 January 2018, Ontivero signed a six-month contract with Chacarita, his first professional contract in his native Argentina. He made three appearances before his contract was cancelled in April 2018.

Johor Darul Ta'zim
In May 2018, Ontivero signed with Johor Darul Ta'zim II, the reserve team of JDT. They sat bottom of the Malaysian second division upon his arrival but finished the 2018 season in fourth place. The following year, JDT II finished second in the league which would have seen the team promoted if not for their parent club already playing in the Super League.

Orlando City
On 24 August 2019, Ontivero returned to North America, signing with USL League One team Orlando City B, the reserve team of Orlando City. He made his debut on the same day in a 3–1 defeat away to FC Tucson.

Juventude
On 2 March 2020, Ontivero signed with Juventude of Brazil's Série B.

Rentistas
Ontivero joined Uruguayan Primera División side Rentistas in October 2020, where he played until leaving the club in April 2021.

Honours
Galatasaray
Türkiye Kupası: 2013–14

Universidad de Chile
Chilean Primera División: Torneo Clausura 2017

References

External links
 

PrvaLiga profile 

1994 births
Living people
Argentine footballers
Association football midfielders
Argentine expatriate footballers
Süper Lig players
Slovenian PrvaLiga players
Major League Soccer players
USL League One players
Chilean Primera División players
Galatasaray S.K. footballers
NK Olimpija Ljubljana (2005) players
Budapest Honvéd FC players
Centro Atlético Fénix players
Club Atlético Independiente footballers
Gaziantepspor footballers
CF Montréal players
Orlando City B players
Esporte Clube Juventude players
Universidad de Chile footballers
C.A. Rentistas players
Expatriate footballers in Chile
Expatriate footballers in Spain
Expatriate footballers in Italy
Expatriate footballers in Turkey
Expatriate footballers in Uruguay
Expatriate footballers in England
Expatriate footballers in Hungary
Expatriate footballers in Slovenia
Expatriate soccer players in Canada
Expatriate footballers in Brazil
Argentine expatriate sportspeople in Turkey
Argentine expatriate sportspeople in Spain
Argentine expatriate sportspeople in England
Argentine expatriate sportspeople in Brazil
Argentine expatriate sportspeople in Uruguay
Designated Players (MLS)
People from Catamarca Province